Eighteen countries have been FIFA World Cup hosts in the competition's twenty-one tournaments since the inaugural World Cup in 1930. The organization at first awarded hosting to countries at meetings of FIFA's congress. The choice of location was controversial in the earliest tournaments, given the three-week boat journey between South America and Europe, the two centers of strength in football at the time.

The decision to hold the first cup in Uruguay, for example, led to only four European nations competing. The next two World Cups were both held in Europe. The decision to hold the second of these, the 1938 FIFA World Cup, in France was controversial, as the South American countries had been led to understand that the World Cup would rotate between the two continents. Both Argentina and Uruguay thus boycotted the tournament. The first tournament following World War II, held in Brazil in 1950, had three teams withdraw for either financial problems or disagreements with the organization.

In order to avoid any future boycotts or controversy, FIFA began a pattern of alternation between the Americas and Europe, which continued until the 2002 FIFA World Cup in Asia. The system evolved so that the host country is now chosen in a vote by FIFA's Congress. This is done under an exhaustive ballot system. The decision is currently made roughly seven years in advance of the tournament, though the hosts for the 2022 tournament were chosen at the same time as those for the 2018 tournament.

Only Mexico, Italy, France, Germany (West Germany until shortly after the 1990 World Cup) and Brazil have hosted the event on two occasions. Mexico City's Estadio Azteca and Rio de Janeiro's Maracanã are the only venues ever to have hosted two FIFA World Cup finals. Only the 2002 FIFA World Cup had more than one host, being split between Japan and South Korea, and in 2026 there will be three hosts: the United States, Canada, and Mexico.

Uruguay in 1930, Italy in 1934, England in 1966, West Germany in 1974, Argentina in 1978 and France in 1998 are the countries which organized an edition of the World Cup and won it.

Upon the selection of Canada–Mexico–United States bid for the 2026 FIFA World Cup, the tournament will be the first to be hosted by more than two countries. Mexico becomes the first country to host three men's World Cups and its Estadio Azteca, should it be selected, will become the first stadium to stage three World Cup tournaments.

List of hosts

1930 FIFA World Cup

Bids:

Before the FIFA Congress could vote on the first-ever World Cup host, a series of withdrawals led to the election of Uruguay. The Netherlands and Hungary withdrew, followed by Sweden withdrawing in favour of Italy. Then both Italy and Spain withdrew, in favour of the only remaining candidate, Uruguay. The FIFA Congress met in Barcelona, Spain on 18 May 1929 to ratify the decision, and Uruguay was chosen without a vote.

Results:

 withdrew
 withdrew
 withdrew
 withdrew
 withdrew
Notice that the celebration of the first World Cup coincided with the centennial anniversary of the first Constitution of Uruguay. For that reason, the main stadium built in Montevideo for the World Cup was named Estadio Centenario.

1934 FIFA World Cup

Bids:

Sweden decided to withdraw before the vote, allowing the only remaining candidate Italy to take the hosting job for the 1934 World Cup. The decision was ratified by the FIFA Congress in Stockholm, Sweden and Zürich, Switzerland on 14 May 1932. The Italian Football Federation accepted the hosting duties on 9 October 1932.

Results:

 withdrew

1938 FIFA World Cup

Bids:

Without any nations withdrawing their bids, the FIFA Congress convened in Berlin, Germany on 13 August 1936 to decide the next host. Electing France took only one ballot, as France had more than half of the votes in the first round.

Results:
, 19 votes
, 3 votes
, 1 vote

Cancelled FIFA World Cups 1942 and 1946
Bids for 1942:

Cancelled FIFA election of the host for the outbreak of the Second World War in September 1939.

Bids for 1946:
 none

1950 and 1954 FIFA World Cups

1950 bid
Bid:

Brazil, Argentina, and Germany had officially bid for the 1942 World Cup, but the Cup was cancelled after the outbreak of World War II. The 1950 World Cup was originally scheduled for 1949, but the day after Brazil was selected by the FIFA Congress on 26 July 1946 in Luxembourg City, Luxembourg, the World Cup was rescheduled for 1950.

Result:

1954 bid
Bid:

The 1954 World Cup hosting duty was decided on 26 July 1946, the same day that Brazil was selected for the 1950 World Cup, in Luxembourg City. On 27 July, the FIFA Congress pushed back the 5th World Cup finals by three years, deciding it should take place in 1954.

Result:

1958 FIFA World Cup

Bid:

Argentina, Chile, Mexico, and Sweden expressed interest in hosting the tournament. Swedish delegates lobbied other countries at the FIFA Congress held in Rio de Janeiro around the opening of the 1950 World Cup finals. Sweden was awarded the 1958 tournament unopposed on 23 June 1950.

Result:

1962 FIFA World Cup

Bids:

West Germany withdrew before the vote, which took place in Lisbon, Portugal on 10 June 1956, leaving two remaining bids. In one round of voting, Chile won over Argentina.

Results:
, 31 votes
, 12 votes
 withdrew

1966 FIFA World Cup

Bids:

Spain withdrew from the bidding prior to voting by the FIFA Congress, held in Rome, Italy on 22 August 1960. Again, there was only one round of voting, with England defeating West Germany.

Results:
, 34 votes
, 27 votes
 withdrew

1970 FIFA World Cup

Bids:

The FIFA Congress convened in Tokyo, Japan on 8 October 1964. One round of voting saw Mexico win the hosting duties over Argentina.

Results:
, 56 votes
, 32 votes
 withdrew
 withdrew
 withdrew

1974, 1978, 1982 FIFA World Cups

Three hosts for the 1974, 1978, and 1982 World Cups were chosen in London, England on 6 July 1966 by the FIFA Congress. Spain and West Germany, both facing each other in the running for hosting duties for the 1974 and 1982 World Cups, agreed to give one another a hosting job. Germany withdrew from the 1982 bidding process while Spain withdrew from the 1974 bidding process, essentially guaranteeing each a hosting spot. Mexico, who had won the 1970 hosting bid over Argentina just two years prior, agreed to withdraw and let Argentina take the 1978 hosting position.

1974 results

 withdrew in exchange for 1982 hosting duties
 withdrew
 withdrew

1978 results

 withdrew
 withdrew, as they had won hosting for 1970

1982 results

 withdrew in exchange for 1974 hosting duties
 withdrew

1986 FIFA World Cup

Bid:

Host voting, handled by the then-FIFA Executive Committee (or Exco), met in Stockholm, Sweden on 9 June 1974 and ratified the unopposed Colombian bid.

Result:

However, Colombia withdrew due to financial reasons on 5 November 1982, less than four years before the event was to start. 

A call for bids was sent out again, and FIFA received intent from three nations:

In Zürich on 20 May 1983, Mexico won the bidding unanimously as voted by the executive committee, for the first time in FIFA World Cup bidding history (excluding nations who bid unopposed).

Results:
 unanimous vote
 0 votes
 0 votes

1990 FIFA World Cup

Bids:

 Iran

Except Italy and the Soviet Union, all nations withdrew before the vote, which was to be conducted by Exco in Zürich on 19 May 1984. Once again, only one round of voting was required, as Italy won more votes than the Soviet Union.

Results:
, 11 votes
, 5 votes
 withdrew
 withdrew
 withdrew
 withdrew
 Iran  withdrew
 withdrew
 withdrew

1994 FIFA World Cup

Bids:

Despite having three nations bidding, voting only took one round. The vote was held in Zürich (for the third straight time) on 4 July 1988. The United States gained a majority of votes of the Exco members.

Results:
, 10 votes
, 7 votes
, 2 votes
 withdrew

1998 FIFA World Cup

Bids:

This vote was held in Zürich for the fourth straight time on 1 July 1992. Only one round of voting was required to have France assume the hosting job over Morocco.

Result:
, 12 votes
, 7 votes
 withdrew
 withdrew
 withdrew

2002 FIFA World Cup

Bids:
/

On 31 May 1996, the hosting selection meeting was held in Zürich for the fifth straight time. A joint bid was formed between Japan and South Korea, and the bid was "voted by acclamation", an oral vote without ballots. The first joint bid of the World Cup was approved, edging out Mexico.

Results:
/ (joint bid, voted by acclamation)

The 2002 FIFA World Cup was co-hosted in Asia for the first time by South Korea and Japan (the opening match was held in South Korea and the final was held in Japan). Initially, the two Asian countries were competitors in the bidding process. But just before the vote, they agreed with FIFA to co-host the event. However, the rivalry and distance between them led to organizational and logistical problems. FIFA has said that co-hosting is not likely to happen again, and in 2004 officially stated that its statutes did not allow co-hosting bids. This policy has since been overturned as the 2026 World Cup will be hosted jointly by the United States, Mexico, and Canada.

2006 FIFA World Cup

Bids:

On 6 July 2000, the host selection meeting was held for the sixth straight time in Zürich. On 4 July 2000, Brazil withdrew its bid before the vote, and the field was narrowed to four. This was the first selection in which more than one vote round was required. Three votes were eventually needed. Germany was at least tied for first in each of the three votes, and ended up defeating South Africa by only one vote after an abstention (see below).

Controversy
The controversy over the decision to award the 2006 FIFA World Cup to Germany led to a further change in practice. The final tally was 12 votes to 11 in favour of Germany over the contenders South Africa, who had been favorites to win. New Zealand FIFA member Charlie Dempsey, who was instructed to vote for South Africa by the Oceania Football Confederation, abstained from voting at the last minute. If he had voted for the South African bid, the tally would have been 12–12, giving the decision to FIFA President Sepp Blatter, who, it was widely believed, would then have voted for South Africa.

Dempsey was among eight members of the executive committee to receive a fax by editors of the German satirical magazine Titanic on Wednesday, the night before the vote, promising a cuckoo clock and Black Forest ham in exchange for voting for Germany. He argued that the pressure from all sides including "an attempt to bribe" him had become too much for him.

On 4 August 2000, consequently, FIFA decided to rotate the hosting of the final tournaments between its constituent confederations. This was until October 2007, during the selection of the host for the 2014 FIFA World Cup, when they announced that they will no longer continue with their continental rotation policy (see below).

2010 FIFA World Cup

Bids:
 
 
 
 
  / 

The first World Cup bidding process under continental rotation (the process of rotating hosting of the World Cup to each confederation in turn) was the 2010 FIFA World Cup, the first World Cup to be held in Africa. On 7 July 2001, during the FIFA Congress in Buenos Aires, a decision was ratified, which was that the rotation will begin in Africa. On 23 September 2002, FIFA's executive committee confirmed that only African member associations, would be invited to submit bids to host the 2010 FIFA World Cup.

In January 2003, Nigeria entered the bidding process, but withdrew their bid in September. In March 2003, Sepp Blatter initially said Nigeria's plan to co host the 2010 FIFA World Cup with four African countries would not work. Nigeria had originally hoped to bid jointly with West African neighbours Benin, Ghana, and Togo.

After it was confirmed by FIFA that joint bidding would not be allowed in the future, Libya and Tunisia withdrew both of their bids on 8 May 2004. On 15 May 2004 in Zürich (the seventh consecutive time that a host selection has been made there), South Africa, after a narrow loss in the 2006 bidding, defeated perennial candidate Morocco to host, 14 votes to 10. Egypt received no votes.

Controversy
On 28 May 2015, media covering the 2015 FIFA corruption case reported that high-ranking officials from the South African bid committee had secured the right to host the World Cup by paying US$10 million in bribes to then-FIFA Vice President Jack Warner and to other FIFA Executive Committee members.

On 4 June 2015, FIFA executive Chuck Blazer, having co-operated with the Federal Bureau of Investigation and the Swiss authorities, confirmed that he and the other members of FIFA's executive committee were bribed in order to promote the South African 1998 and 2010 World Cups. Blazer stated, "I and others on the FIFA executive committee agreed to accept bribes in conjunction with the selection of South Africa as the host nation for the 2010 World Cup."

On 6 June 2015, The Daily Telegraph reported that Morocco had received the most votes, but South Africa was awarded the tournament instead.

2014 FIFA World Cup

Bids:
 & 

FIFA continued its continental rotation procedure by earmarking the 2014 World Cup for South America. FIFA initially indicated that it might back out of the rotation concept, but later decided to continue it through the 2014 host decision, after which it was dropped.

Colombia had expressed interest in hosting the 2014 World Cup, but withdrew, undertaking the 2011 FIFA U-20 World Cup. Brazil also expressed interest in hosting the World Cup. CONMEBOL, the South American Football Federation, indicated their preference for Brazil as a host. Brazil was the only nation to submit a formal bid when the official bidding procedure for CONMEBOL member associations was opened in December 2006, as by that time, Colombia, Chile and Argentina had already withdrawn, and Venezuela was not allowed to bid.

Brazil made the first unopposed bid since the initial selection of the 1986 FIFA World Cup (when Colombia was selected as host, but later withdrew for financial problems). The FIFA Executive Committee confirmed it as the host country on 30 October 2007 by a unanimous decision.

Result:

2018 and 2022 FIFA World Cups

2018 Bids:
 and 

 and 

2022 Bids:

FIFA announced on 29 October 2007 that it will no longer continue with its continental rotation policy, implemented after the 2006 World Cup host selection. The newest host selection policy is that any country may bid for a World Cup, provided that their continental confederation has not hosted either of the past two World Cups. For the 2018 World Cup bidding process, this meant that bids from Africa and South America were not allowed.

For the 2022 World Cup bidding process, this meant that bids from South America and Europe were not allowed. Also, FIFA formally allowed joint bids once more (after they were banned in 2002), because there was only one organizing committee per joint bid, unlike Korea–Japan, which had two different organizing committees. Countries that announced their interest included Australia, England, Indonesia, Japan, Qatar, Russia, South Korea, United States, the joint bid of Spain and Portugal and the joint bid of Belgium and Netherlands.

The hosts for both World Cups were announced by the FIFA Executive Committee on 2 December 2010. Russia was selected to host the 2018 FIFA World Cup, making it the first time that the World Cup will be hosted in Eastern Europe and making it the biggest country geographically to host the World Cup. Qatar was selected to host the 2022 FIFA World Cup, making it the first time a World Cup will be held in the Arab World and the second time in Asia since the 2002 tournament in South Korea and Japan. Also, the decision made it the smallest country geographically to host the World Cup. Eight stadiums will host the event across five cities in Qatar: Lusail, Al Khor, Al Rayyan, Al Wakrah and Doha.

2026 FIFA World Cup

Under FIFA rules as of 2016, the 2026 Cup could not be in either Europe (UEFA) or Asia (AFC), leaving an African (CAF) bid, a North American (CONCACAF) bid, a South American (CONMEBOL) bid or an Oceanian (OFC) bid as other possible options. In March 2017, FIFA's president Gianni Infantino confirmed that "Europe (UEFA) and Asia (AFC) had been excluded from the bidding following the selection of Russia and Qatar in 2018 and 2022 respectively."

The bidding process was originally scheduled to start in 2015, with the appointment of hosts scheduled for the FIFA Congress on 10 May 2017 in Kuala Lumpur, Malaysia. On 10 June 2015, FIFA announced that the bid process for the 2026 FIFA World Cup was postponed. However, following the FIFA Council meeting on 10 May 2016, a new bid schedule was announced for May 2020 as the last in a four-phase process.

On 14 October 2016, FIFA said it would accept a tournament-sharing bid by CONCACAF members Canada, Mexico and the United States.

On 10 April 2017, Canada, the United States, and Mexico announced their intention to submit a joint bid to co-host, with three-quarters of the games to be played in the U.S., including the final.

On 11 August 2017, Morocco officially announced a bid to host.

Therefore, the official 2026 FIFA World Cup bids were from two football confederations. The first one was from CONCACAF, which was triple bid by Canada, United States and Mexico, and the second one was from CAF with a bid by Morocco.

The host was announced on 13 June 2018 at the 68th FIFA Congress in Moscow, Russia. The United Bid from Canada, Mexico and the United States was selected over the Morocco bid by 134 votes to 65 with 1 selecting neither and 3 abstentions. This will be the first World Cup to be hosted by more than two countries. Mexico becomes the first country to host three men's World Cups and its Estadio Azteca, should selected, will become the first stadium to stage three World Cup tournaments. On the other hand, Canada becomes the fifth country to host both the men's and women's World Cups, after Sweden (Men's: 1958/Women's: 1995), United States (Men's: 1994/Women's: 1999, 2003), Germany (Men's: 1974, 2006/Women's: 2011), and France (Men's: 1938, 1998/Women's: 2019). The United States becomes the first country to host both men's and women's World Cup twice each.

2030 FIFA World Cup

The bidding process for this World Cup has yet to start. Some early bids for the 2030 FIFA World Cup – the Centennial World Cup – have however been proposed. The first proposed bid has been a collective bid by the members of the Argentine Football Association and Uruguayan Football Association into a proposed joint bid from Uruguay and Argentina. The second bid has been a proposed bid by The Football Association of England. Under FIFA rules as of 2017 that prohibit the previous two confederations hosting the next world Cup, the 2030 World Cup cannot be held in Asia (AFC) because the Asian Football Confederation is excluded from the bidding following the selection of Qatar in 2022, nor in North America because the CONCACAF countries of the United States, Canada and Mexico will host the 2026 World Cup. Also in June 2017, UEFA's president Aleksander Čeferin stated that Europe (UEFA) will definitely fight for its right to host the 2030 World Cup.

The Uruguay–Argentina proposed bid would not coincide with the centennial anniversary of the first FIFA World Cup final, and the bicentennial of the first Constitution of Uruguay, but if selected the tournament dates would coincide. The Uruguay-Argentina bid was officially confirmed on 29 July 2017. A joint bid was announced by the Argentine Football Association and the Uruguayan Football Association on 29 July 2017. Before Uruguay and Argentina played out a goalless draw in Montevideo, FC Barcelona players Luis Suárez and Lionel Messi promoted the bid with commemorative shirts. On 31 August 2017, it was suggested Paraguay would join as a third host. CONMEBOL, the South American confederation, confirmed the joint three-way bid in September 2017.

English FA vice chairman David Gill has proposed that his country could bid for 2030, provided the bidding process is made more transparent. "England is one of few countries that could stage even a 48-nation event in its entirety, while Football Association chief executive Martin Glenn made it clear earlier this year bidding for 2030 was an option." In June 2017, UEFA stated that "it would support a pan-British bid for 2030 or even a single bid from England." On 15 July 2018, Deputy Leader of the UK Labour Party, Tom Watson, said in an interview that he and his party backed a 2030 World Cup bid for the UK saying that "I hope it's one of the first things a Labour government does, which is work with our FA to try and put a World Cup bid together." On 16 July 2018, British Prime Minister Theresa May expressed her support of the bid and her openness about discussions with football authorities. Although there had been no prior discussion with the Football Association, the Scottish FA also expressed its interest about joining a Home Nations bid. Former Scottish First Minister Henry McLeish has called the Scottish government and the Scottish Football Association to bid for the 2030 FIFA World Cup with the other British nations.

On 17 June 2018, the Royal Moroccan Football Federation announced its co-bidding for the 2030 World Cup. There is a possibility for a joint bid with Tunisia and Algeria.

On 17 June 2018, the English Football Association announced that they are in talks with home nations over a UK-wide bid to host the 2030 World Cup. On 1 August 2018, it was reported that the FA was preparing a bid for England to host the World Cup in 2030. A decision is expected to be made in 2019, after the FA has conducted feasibility work on a potential bid. The Scottish Football Association considered the potential British bid as a great opportunity to get funds to renovate and redevelop Hampden Park in Glasgow, the Scotland national football team's home stadium. On 4 September 2018, it was announced that the Republic of Ireland was in talks exploring the possibility to join 2030 World Cup bid.

On 10 July 2018, Egypt's Sports Minister expressed interest in bidding.

Cameroonian presidential candidate Joshua Oish's political program includes nominating his country along with two sub-Saharan African countries to host the 2030 World Cup, according to Cameroonian channel CRTV.

On 12 September 2018, Prime Minister of Spain Pedro Sánchez discussed the possibility for Spain to bid with FIFA President Gianni Infantino and Royal Spanish Football Federation President Luis Rubiales. On 8 June 2019, Spain and Portugal expressed interest in co-hosting the 2030 FIFA World Cup.

On 2 November 2018, Prime Minister of Bulgaria Boyko Borisov stated that his Greek counterpart Alexis Tsipras had proposed a joint bid by Bulgaria, Romania, Serbia and Greece during the Balkan Four meeting in Varna. At the meeting of the Ministers of Youth and Sports of Serbia, Vanja Udovičić, Bulgaria's Krasen Kralev, Romania's Constantin Bogdan Matei and Deputy Minister of Culture and Sports of Greece, Giorgos Vasileiadis, it was officially confirmed that these four countries would submit a joint candidacy for the organization of the 2028 UEFA European Football Championship and the 2030 World Cup.

On 15 January 2019 FIFA president Gianni Infantino supported the Morocco, Portugal and Spain bid to host the 2030 World Cup, dealing a blow for England, Ireland, Northern Ireland, Scotland and Wales' hope, though it was still "very early" to speak of it.

Chile confirmed their bid to host with the group on 14 February 2019 as a joint communique from the confirmed nations joining Argentina, Paraguay and Uruguay.

The host will be announced during the 74th FIFA Congress in 2024.

Confirmed plan to bid:
 CONMEBOL:
  /  /  / : Uruguay–Argentina–Chile–Paraguay 2030 FIFA World Cup bid
 UEFA / CAF:
  /  / : Spain–Portugal–Morocco 2030 FIFA World Cup bid
 AFC / CAF / UEFA:
  /  / : Egypt–Greece–Saudi Arabia 2030 FIFA World Cup bid

Expressed interest in bidding:
 AFC:
 
 North Korea /  China
 Japan /  / 
 CAF:
 / 
 CONMEBOL
  /  / 
 UEFA:

2034 FIFA World Cup

The bidding process for this World Cup has yet to start. Some early bids for the 2034 FIFA World Cup have however been proposed. The first bid for the 2034 FIFA World Cup has been proposed as a collective bid by the members of the Association of Southeast Asian Nations. 

The idea of a combined ASEAN bid had been mooted as early as January 2011, when the former Football Association of Singapore President, Zainudin Nordin, said in a statement that the proposal had been made at an ASEAN Foreign Ministers meeting, despite the fact that countries cannot bid directly - this is up to national associations. In 2013, Nordin and Special Olympics Malaysia President, Datuk Mohamed Feisol Hassan, recalled the idea for ASEAN to jointly host a World Cup.

Under FIFA rules as of 2017, the 2030 World Cup cannot be held in Asia (AFC) as Asian Football Confederation members are excluded from the bidding following the selection of Qatar in 2022. Therefore, the earliest bid by an AFC member could be made for 2034.

Later, Malaysia withdrew from involvement, but Singapore and other ASEAN countries continued the campaign to submit a joint bid for the World Cup in 2034. In February 2017, ASEAN held talks on launching a joint bid during a visit by FIFA President Gianni Infantino to Yangon, Myanmar. On 1 July 2017, Vice General Chairman of the Football Association of Indonesia Joko Driyono said that Indonesia and Thailand were set to lead a consortium of Southeast Asian nations in the bid. Driyono added that due to geographical and infrastructure considerations and the expanded format (48 teams), at least two or three ASEAN countries combined would be in a position necessary to host matches.

In September 2017, the Thai League 1 Deputy CEO Benjamin Tan, at the ASEAN Football Federation (AFF) Council meeting, confirmed that his Association has "put in their interest to bid and co-host" the 2034 World Cup with Indonesia. On the same occasion, the General Secretary of the AFF, Dato Sri Azzuddin Ahmad, confirmed that Indonesia and Thailand will submit a joint bid. Indonesia is the only Southeast Asian country to have participated in the World Cup, when the territory was known as the Dutch East Indies.

However, in June 2018, FIFA executive committee member and crown prince and regent of Pahang, Tengku Abdullah who is also the former President of the Football Association of Malaysia (FAM) expressed interest in joining the three countries in hosting the World Cup together. The four countries have jointly hosted a football event before during the 2007 AFC Asian Cup: if the FAM agrees to rejoin the project, they would be the first to submit a four-country joint bid in the FIFA World Cup history.

The second bid is from Egypt. Its Sports and Youth Minister Ashraf Sobhy said that Egypt has considered a bid to host the 2034 FIFA World Cup. Such a bid should be prepared by the national football association rather than the country.

After its failed bid to host the 2022 FIFA World Cup, Australia has considered a joint bid with neighbouring New Zealand, an OFC member.

 AFC:
 AFC–OFC:
,  and/or 
 CAF:

Total bids by country
World Cup-winning bids are bolded. Withdrawn bids are italicized. Rejected bids, as well as planned but not-yet-official bids for 2030 and beyond, are not included.

Host country performances

Except in 1934, when Italy had to qualify for the main tournament, host nations have always been granted automatic spots in the World Cup.

It is widely considered that home advantage is a benefit in the World Cup, with the host team usually performing above average. In 13 of the 22 tournaments a host country has reached the last 4. Of the 8 teams that have won the tournament, all except Brazil and Spain have been champions while hosting, with England winning its only title as hosts. Further, Sweden got to its only final on home soil. Chile and South Korea had their only semi-final finishes at home, and Mexico (twice) and an independent Russia achieved their only finishes in the top eight while hosting. South Africa and Qatar are the only hosts to not go past the first round.

References

External links
FIFA World Cup Host Announcement Decision (PDF)
FIFA World Cup 2022 

FIFA World Cup
 
FIFA World Cup-related lists